Cavallermaggiore is a comune (municipality) in the Province of Cuneo in the Italian region Piedmont, located about  south of Turin and about  northeast of Cuneo.

Cavallermaggiore borders the following municipalities: Bra, Cavallerleone, Cherasco, Marene, Monasterolo di Savigliano, Racconigi, Ruffia, Sanfrè, Savigliano, and Sommariva del Bosco.

References

Cities and towns in Piedmont